Dzheyrakhsky District is an administrative and municipal district (raion), one of the four in the Republic of Ingushetia, Russia. It is located in the south of the republic. Its administrative center is the rural locality (a selo) of Dzheyrakh. As of the 2010 Census, the total population of the district was 2,638, with the population of Dzheyrakh accounting for 57.4% of that number.

History
The district was established in October 1993.

Administrative structure

Administrative and municipal status
Within the framework of administrative divisions, Dzheyrakhsky District is one of the four in the Republic of Ingushetia and has administrative jurisdiction over all of its eighty-five rural localities. As a municipal division, the district is incorporated as Dzheyrakhsky Municipal District. Its eighty-five rural localities are incorporated into five rural settlements within the municipal district. The selo of Dzheyrakh serves as the administrative center of both the administrative and municipal district.

Culture
The Dzheyrakh-Assin historical and architectural museum and nature reserve, including Tkhaba-Yerdy Church, is located in the district.

References

Notes

Sources

Districts of Ingushetia
World Heritage Tentative List